Maksim Alekseyevich Vityugov (born 1 February 1998) is a Russian football player who plays as a defensive midfielder for PFC Krylia Sovetov Samara.

Club career
He made his debut in the Russian Professional Football League for FC Chertanovo Moscow on 10 April 2016 in a game against FC Zenit Penza. He made his Russian Football National League debut for Chertanovo on 17 July 2018 in a game against FC Rotor Volgograd.

He made his Russian Premier League debut for PFC Krylia Sovetov Samara on 25 July 2021 in a game against FC Akhmat Grozny.

Career statistics

References

External links
 
 
 Profile by Russian Professional Football League

1998 births
Sportspeople from Krasnoyarsk
Living people
Russian footballers
Association football midfielders
FC Chertanovo Moscow players
PFC Krylia Sovetov Samara players
Russian Premier League players
Russian First League players
Russian Second League players